Çağlar Şahin Akbaba (born 17 March 1995) is a Turkish professional footballer who plays as a goalkeeper for Boluspor.

Professional career
Akbaba made his professional debut for Kardemir Karabükspor in a 2-0 Süper Lig loss to Konyaspor on 11 December 2017.

International career
Akbaba is a one-time youth international for the Turkey U19s in a 3-1 friendly loss to the Netherlands U19s on 13 October 2013.

References

External links
 
 
 
 Kardemir Karabukspor Profile

1995 births
Living people
People from Konak
Turkish footballers
Turkey youth international footballers
Bucaspor footballers
Elazığspor footballers
Kardemir Karabükspor footballers
Adana Demirspor footballers
Bursaspor footballers
Gaziantep F.K. footballers
Eyüpspor footballers
Boluspor footballers
Süper Lig players
TFF First League players
Association football goalkeepers